Eli (Eliezer) Somer (born 1951) is an Israeli Professor of Clinical Psychology at the University of Haifa, School of Social Work. He is the former President of both the European Society for Trauma and Dissociation (ESTD, 2009-2011) and the International Society for the Study of Trauma and Dissociation (ISSTD, 2005-2006), and serves as scientific advisor in Trauma and Dissociation Israel.

Biography

Personal life
Somer was born in Israel, a son of Holocaust survivors.

Academic and professional life
Somer received his Bachelor’s and Master’s degrees from The University of Haifa in Israel (1976, 1980). He received his PhD at the University of Florida in 1984. Somer’s doctoral dissertation under the supervision of Carolyn M. Tucker was on "Spouse Marital Adjustment and Patient Life Engagement as Factors in Dietary Compliance of Chronic Hemodialysis Patients."

Between 1987 and 2007 he was a Clinical Director of Maytal - Israel Institute for Treatment and Study of Stress. Somer's service at the University of Haifa began in 1987, when he joined the R.D. Wolfe Centre for the Study of Stress. He has been a faculty member of the University of Haifa School of Social Work since 1992.

Somer is a Ministry of Health (Israel) certified supervisor in both clinical psychology and hypnosis.

Currently, he is a clinical professor of psychology at the University of Haifa School of Social Work. He is also a Clinical Director at Somer Counseling and Psychotherapy, and serves as scientific advisor in Trauma and Dissociation Israel.

Eli Somer has conducted research on maladaptive daydreaming, and is credited with coining the term.

Honors and awards
 2000 Cornelia Wilbur award by International Society for the Study of Dissociation
 Fellow, International Society for the Study of Dissociation
 2014 Lifetime achievement award by International Society for the Study of Dissociation

Publications

Books
 Somer, E. (1999). Dual Relationships: Seduction and sexual exploitation in counseling and psychotherapy. Tel Aviv: Papyrus - Tel Aviv University Publishing House (in Hebrew), 279 pages.
 Somer, E. & Bleich, A. (Eds.) (2005). Mental Health In Terror's Shadow: The Israeli Experience . Tel Aviv: Ramot - Tel Aviv University (in Hebrew), 588 pages.

Articles
Some of Somer's more notable publications:
 Somer, Eli, and Anat Braunstein. "Are children exposed to interparental violence being psychologically maltreated?." Aggression and Violent Behavior 4.4 (1999): 449-456.
 Somer, Eli, and Meir Saadon. "Therapist-client sex: Clients' retrospective reports." Professional Psychology: Research and Practice 30.5 (1999): 504.
 Somer, Eli, and Meir Saadon. "Stambali: Dissociative possession and trance in a Tunisian healing dance." Transcultural Psychiatry 37.4 (2000): 580-600.
 Somer, Eli, and Sharona Szwarcberg. "Variables in delayed disclosure of childhood sexual abuse." American Journal of Orthopsychiatry 71.3 (2001): 332.
 Somer, Eli, Michael Dolgin, and Meir Saadon. "Validation of the Hebrew version of the Dissociative Experiences Scale (H-DES) in Israel." Journal of Trauma & Dissociation 2.2 (2001): 53-65.
 Somer, Eli, et al. "The stress and coping of Israeli emergency room social workers following terrorist attacks." Qualitative Health Research 14.8 (2004): 1077-1093.
 Somer, Eli, et al. "Terrorism, distress and coping: High versus low impact regions and direct versus indirect civilian exposure." Anxiety, Stress, and Coping 18.3 (2005): 165-182.
 Somer, Eli, et al. "Brief cognitive-behavioral phone-based intervention targeting anxiety about the threat of attack: A pilot study." Behaviour Research and Therapy 43.5 (2005): 669-679.

References

External links
 The International Advisory Board of the Jewish Coalition Against Sexual Abuse/Assault
 The European Society for Trauma and Dissociation 
 Personal website
 Dr. Carolyn M. Tucker
 Prof. Erika Fromm
 Trauma and Dissociation Israel

Living people
Israeli Jews
Israeli psychologists
Clinical psychologists
Academic staff of the University of Haifa
University of Haifa alumni
1951 births